Shino Yanagisawa (born 20 February 1974) is a Japanese luger. She competed in the women's singles event at the 1998 Winter Olympics.

References

1974 births
Living people
Japanese female lugers
Olympic lugers of Japan
Lugers at the 1998 Winter Olympics
Sportspeople from Hokkaido